The 2015 Omloop van het Hageland was the eleventh running of the Omloop van het Hageland, a women's bicycle race in Belgium. It was held on 8 March 2015, over a distance of  around Tielt-Winge. It was rated by the UCI as a 1.2 category race. The race was won by Belgian rider Jolien D'Hoore of the  team, who won the sprint from a front group of eleven riders.

Preview
Several UCI Women's Teams like ,  and  did not participate because they rode the Strade Bianche in Italy the day before. A main favourite Ellen van Dijk could not start due to a back injury – as the team did not have any reserves following Strade Bianche, Larissa Havik competed as a guest rider for the team, so the team had the fewest riders to start.

Results

See also
2015 in women's road cycling

References

External links

 

Omloop van het Hageland
Omloop van het Hageland
Omloop van het Hageland